Stare Połcie  is a village in the administrative district of Gmina Janowiec Kościelny, within Nidzica County, Warmian-Masurian Voivodeship, in northern Poland.

The village has a population of 130.

See also 
 Połcie Młode, a small village part of Stare Połcie.

References 

Villages in Nidzica County